Polling is a municipality in the district of Mühldorf in Bavaria in Germany. It lies on the river Inn.

References

Mühldorf (district)
Populated places on the Inn (river)